Rural Route 4 is the Missouri-based barbershop quartet that won the 1986 SPEBSQSA international competition. They are known for their signature costumes of matching overalls in keeping with the rural theme of their group in venues where formal attire is expected.

Calvin's son, Wes Yoder, later replaced Don as the group's tenor until their formal retirement in 1994.

Discography
 My Life, My Love, My Song, cassette, CD; 1992
 Friends and Relatives, LP, cassette; 1987
 Saturday Night Sunday Mornin''',  LP, cassette; 1985
 Friends and Relatives'', CD; 1987

References

External links
 Discography and biography from Primarily A Cappella
 Discography from Mike Barkley's Monster list
 AIC entry

Barbershop quartets
Barbershop Harmony Society